Mike Davis is an American politician who served in the California State Assembly. Davis was declared the fourth most loyal Democratic voter in the California State Legislature in the Sacramento Bee 2011–2012 listing. He voted against the Democratic Party only 2% of the time given over 3,500 of votes taken. Mike Davis currently serves as president pro tem of the City of Los Angeles Board of Public Works.

Early life and education
Mike Davis was born in Charlotte, North Carolina.

He earned his Bachelor of Arts degree in history from the University of North Carolina at Charlotte, a Master of Public Administration degree from California State University at Northridge, and a Master of Arts degree in behavioral science with a concentration in negotiations and conflict management from California State University at Dominguez Hills. He has also completed Innovations in Governance Program and State and Local Government Program at the John F. Kennedy School of Government at Harvard University and is the first elected official to obtain the Executive Master of Leadership Degree from the USC Price School of Public Policy. Davis earned his doctorate degree in organizational leadership at the University of Southern California, where he served as a dean's scholar. He was inducted into the Phi Kappa Phi Honor Society in recognition of being among the top 10% of scholars across all disciplines at the university.

Early political career
As advisor to the Upsilon Chapter of Kappa Alpha Psi Fraternity, Davis started The Images of Blacks in America Symposium at UCLA, which is a conference for high school and college students and professionals. Davis served as Chairman of the Western Regional Social Action Committee of Kappa Alpha Psi fraternity and past member of the National Social Action Commission. Davis also served on the Black Advisory Committee to the Los Angeles Police Department Commission.

Davis was elected president of the New Frontier Democratic Club.  He served as a member of the Democratic Party County Central Committee and the Democratic National Committee.  He was elected super delegate to the 1992, 2000 and  2004 Democratic National Conventions. Davis was appointed as a Barack Obama Delegate at the 2008 DNC and reappointed at 2012 DNC. He was the 48th Assembly District 2004 Democrat of the Year. Davis served as 2008 Legislator of the Year for California Association of Clerks and Elections Officials, 2009 Outstanding Legislator by California Sheriffs Association: 2010, The Thomas Kilgore Service Award, USC Alumni Association; and 2011 Tom Bradley Award from the American Society for Public Administration. He received the 2011 Legislator of the Year from the Los Angeles National Women's Political Caucus and 2012 Political Achievement Award from New Frontier Democratic Club.

Before being elected to the Assembly, Davis served as Los Angeles County Supervisor Yvonne Brathwaite Burke’s Senior Deputy Director. He also served as District Director for Congresswoman 
Maxine Waters during her tenure in the California State Assembly and when she was elected to Congress.

Assembly
Davis won the June 3, 2006 primary against civil rights attorney Anthony Willoughby with over 53% of the vote.  He won the general election against Republican Brenda Carol Green with over 88% of the vote .

Davis served as vice chair of the California Legislative Black Caucus and coordinated the California Legislative Black Caucus Policy Weekend in this capacity.  He also served as chair on the Select Committee on Rail Transportation. Additionally, Davis served as a member of the Assembly Committees on Appropriations, Environmental Safety, Local Government, Committee on Rules, Joint Committee on Rules and the Select Committees on High-Speed Rail and Procurement. Davis was a member of Los Angeles Coliseum Commission and California Cultural and Historical Endowment Commission. He served as chair of the Assembly Arts, Entertainment, Sports, Tourism and Internet Media Committee as well as past member of the Select Committee on the Preservation of the Entertainment Industry.

Davis also served as a member of the National Council of the American Society for Public Administration. He is the first California legislator to endorse U.S. Senator Barack Obama for president. 
 
Davis successfully acquired the Governor's signature on his bill AB 868 which requires the California Energy Commission to do a one-year study of the temperature of fuel at the pumps to determine if Californians are getting all of the gas they are purchasing. Assemblyman Davis made history when Governor Jerry Brown signed his bill AB 420 (Redistricting) ending prison gerrymandering in California. This practice where prisoners are counted in areas where they are incarcerated and not where they live for redistricting unfairly dilutes minority representation. California became the fourth state in the country to end the unfair practice. Davis also achieved the passage of AB 126 which urges judicial diversity in the appointment of 
minorities and women to serve as judges in California's State Superior Courts.

The Davis legislative agenda includes increasing penalties for those who create mortgage fraud in 
California. His bill AB 1950(extend the statute of limitation from 1 to 3 years) is sponsored by California Attorney General Kamala Harris as a part of the state's "California Homeowners Bills of Rights". Moreover, he also authored AB 327 (3 strikes reform) which passed the Assembly and sought to reform the three strikes policy to include a serious or violent offense before assigning 25 years to violators, saving the state millions of dollars. Assemblyman Davis co-chaired the California Initiative on Three Strikes (Proposition 36) which won with over 70% of the vote.  
 
Davis started his career assisting Congressman John Conyers in the fight to establish Dr. Martin Luther King. Jr's Birthday as a national holiday. He has established an annual Martin Luther King, Jr., National Holiday Program and Living Legends African American History Program at California African American Museum.  In addition, Davis has also developed both a Korean Advisory Council and Latino Advisory Council in the 48th District.

Davis authored legislation, creating California law on topics such as: Public utilities procurement for minority-owned businesses, career technical education, elder and dependent adult abuse, notaries public, gasoline dispensing: weight and measures, vandalism penalties:community service, Political Reform Act of 1974: electronic filing, and military service job protection, student athletic contracts, gang injunctions, public service recognition week, multifamily housing for veterans, arts education month, long-term health care facilities: admission contracts,  firearm permits policy, judicial diversity,  mortgage fraud, and criminal justice reform (three strikes policy).

President Pro Tem, Los Angeles Board of Public Works Commission
Mayor Eric Garcetti appointed Davis to the Board of Public Works in 2013 and reappointed him in 2018, where he was confirmed by the Los Angeles City Council. The Board of Public Works Commission serves as general managers of the City of Los Angeles Department of Public Works, including five bureaus: Contract Administration, Engineering, Sanitation, Street Lighting, and Street Services. Mike Davis serves as President Pro Tem of the Board and liaison to Contract Administration where he serves as an expert on achieving diversity, public administration, public policy, negotiation and conflict management, and organizational leadership.

Dr. Davis serves as the Co-Chair of the Los Angeles Ad-Hoc Committee on Contracting Diversity and the Los Angeles Historically Black Colleges and Universities (HBCU) Recruitment Committee. He received the Black Music Month Special Recognition Award from the Los Angeles Black Business Association (BBA) for his work in coordinating the city's African American Heritage Month Program, in 2018; and the Minority Business Advocate Award from the Greater Los Angeles Area Chamber of Commerce (GLAAC) in 2019. Dr. Davis also serves as the Chief Racial Equity Officer for the Los Angeles Board of Public Works Commission. He established a recognition program for prime contractors who value business inclusion and authored the Boards' Community Level Contracting Policy. The policy creates small and emerging business contracts in the City of Los Angeles Public Works Bureaus. This policy will have a positive economic impact throughout every community within the city.

.

Chairman, Los Angeles African American Heritage Month Committee
Mike Davis serves as chair of the City of Los Angeles African American Heritage Month Committee, held in conjunction with the Office of the Mayor and Our Authors Study Club(OASC). OASC, which started this program in 1948, is the Los Angeles chapter of Dr. Carter G. Woodson's Association for the Study of African American Life and History. Dr. Davis, who is also an historian, has continued the tradition of featuring internationally recognized achievers, as well as helped develop a Los Angeles Hall of FAME section of the program recognizing outstanding professional achievers. Dr. Davis chaired African American History Month Programs for both the Los Angeles County Board of Supervisors and the California State Assembly.

External links
2009 Campaign Website
Mike Davis section on California State Assembly Democratic Caucus website
smartvoter.org listing
Join California Mike Davis

1957 births
Living people
African-American state legislators in California
California State University, Northridge alumni
California State University, Dominguez Hills alumni
Harvard Kennedy School alumni
Members of the California State Assembly
Politicians from Charlotte, North Carolina
Politicians from Los Angeles
University of North Carolina at Charlotte alumni
USC Sol Price School of Public Policy alumni
21st-century American politicians
21st-century African-American politicians
20th-century African-American people